This is a List of forest research institutes in India.

Autonomous research institutes

Ministry of Environment and Forests 

Institutes under India's Ministry of Environment, Forest and Climate Change

 Govind Ballabh Pant Institute of Himalayan Environment & Development, Almora
 Indian Institute of Forest Management, Bhopal
 Indian Plywood Industries Research and Training Institute, Bengaluru
 Wildlife Institute of India, Dehradun

Indian Council of Forestry Research and Education 

Institutes under the Indian Council of Forestry Research and Education Headquartered in Dehradun

 Advanced Research Centre for Bamboo and Rattan, Aizawl
 Arid Forest Research Institute, Jodhpur
 Centre for Forest Based Livelihood and Extension (CFLE), Agartala
 Centre for Forestry Research and Human Resource Development, Chhindwara
 Centre for Social Forestry and Eco-Rehabilitation, Prayagraj
 Forest Research Institute (India), Dehradun
 Himalayan Forest Research Institute, Shimla
 Institute of Forest Biodiversity, Hyderabad
 Institute of Forest Genetics and Tree Breeding, Coimbatore
 Institute of Forest Productivity, Ranchi
 Institute of Wood Science and Technology, Bengaluru
 Rain Forest Research Institute, Jorhat
 Tropical Forest Research Institute, Jabalpur
 Van Vigyan Kendra (Forest Science Centres)

Other national institutes 
Other research institutes under the Ministry of Environment and Forestry

Subordinate offices
 Forest Survey of India, Dehradun
 Indira Gandhi National Forest Academy, Dehradun
 Directorate of Forest Education, Dehradun
 Botanical Survey of India, Kolkata
 National Institute of Animal Welfare, Faridabad
 National Zoological Park, New Delhi
 National Museum of Natural History, New Delhi
 Zoological Survey of India, Kolkata
 Wildlife Crime Control Bureau (WCCB)

Authorities
 Central Zoo Authority of India, New Delhi
 National Biodiversity Authority, Chennai
 National Ganga River Basin Authority, New Delhi
 National Tiger Conservation Authority, New Delhi

Centres of excellence
 Centre for Environment Education, Ahmedabad
 C.P.R. Environmental Education Center, Chennai
 Centre for Animals and Environment, Bengaluru
 Centre of Excellence in Environmental Economics, Chennai
 Foundation for Revitalisation of Local Health Traditions, Bengaluru
 Centre for Ecological Sciences, Bengaluru
 Centre for Environmental Management of Degraded Ecosystem, Delhi
 Centre for Mining Environment, Dhanbad
 Salim Ali Center for Ornithology and Natural History (SACON), Coimbatore
 Tropical Botanic Garden and Research Institute, Thiruvananthapuram

Under state governments 

 Kerala Forest Research Institute, Peechi, Thrissur
 Forest College and Research Institute, Tamil Nadu Agricultural University, Mettupalayam
 Forest Research Institute, Kanpur, Uttar Pradesh Forest Department
 Gujarat Forest Research Centre, Rajpipla, Gujarat
 State Forest Department, Jammu
 State Forest Research and Training Institute, Raipur,  Chhattisgarh
 State Forest Research Institute, Jabalpur, Madhya Pradesh
 State Forest Research Institute, Chennai, Tamil Nadu
 State Forest Research Institute, Ladhowal, District Ludhiana, Punjab
 State Forest Research Institute, Itanagar, Arunachal Pradesh

See also 
 List of forest research institutes
 Ministry of Environment and Forests (India)
 Indian Council of Forestry Research and Education
 Indian Forest Service

References

External links
 Ministry of Environment and Forests
 Indian Council of Forestry Research and Education
 Resources on Ministry of Environment and Forests (MoEF)

 01
Institutes
Research institutes
India, Forest research institutes
Lists of government agencies in India
India,Forest
Nature conservation in India
Environmental organisations based in India
Ministry of Environment, Forest and Climate Change
Research institutes in India